Timo Phil Horn (born 12 May 1993) is a German professional footballer who plays as a goalkeeper for Bundesliga club 1. FC Köln.

Club career
Horn started his youth career at SC Rondorf and joined 1. FC Köln, a club he supported, in 2002. At the age of 15, he rejected Liverpool. He was on both the senior and reserve team squads for both the 2010–11 and 2011–12 seasons. However, Horn only made appearances for the reserve squad in those two seasons.

Upon Köln's relegation to the 2. Bundesliga following the 2011–12 season, their top two keepers, Michael Rensing and Miro Varvodić, were released from the club, allowing Horn to become the team's first choice goalkeeper entering the 2012–13 season, receiving a vote of confidence from ex-caretaker manager Frank Schaefer.

Köln proceeded to spend two seasons in the 2. Bundesliga, finishing 5th in 2012–13, and 1st the following year, earning a promotion back to the Bundesliga. Horn started all but three games in net over those two seasons, finishing with 27 combined clean sheets, including a league-leading 16 in 2013–14. As a team, Köln gave up merely 20 goals during the season, well ahead of the next fewest FC Ingolstadt, who allowed 33. Following the season, Horn was voted by Köln fans as the Player of the Season.

Horn made his Bundesliga debut against Hamburger SV on 23 August 2014, recording a clean sheet. In fact, Horn began his Bundesliga career by not allowing a goal in his first four matches, a feat previously never accomplished. On 19 December 2014, Horn signed a contract extension to stay at Köln until 2019, citing his childhood dream of playing for Köln in the Bundesliga as a hometown player.

Following the 2015–16 season, Horn was once again voted as the team's Player of the Season. Making 33 starts, Horn recorded 8 clean sheets while giving up 40 goals.

On 8 April 2018, Horn signed a contract extension with Köln, keeping him at the club until 2022.

International career
Horn was part of the squad for the 2016 Summer Olympics, where Germany won the silver medal.

Career statistics

Honours
1. FC Köln
 2. Bundesliga: 2013-14, 2018-19

Germany
Summer Olympic Games: silver medal 2016

References

1993 births
Living people
Footballers from Cologne
German footballers
Association football goalkeepers
Bundesliga players
2. Bundesliga players
Regionalliga players
1. FC Köln II players
1. FC Köln players
Germany youth international footballers
Germany under-21 international footballers
Footballers at the 2016 Summer Olympics
Olympic footballers of Germany
Medalists at the 2016 Summer Olympics
Olympic silver medalists for Germany
Olympic medalists in football